DYFL (90.5 FM), broadcasting as 90.5 Like Radio, is a radio station owned and operated by Capitol Broadcasting Center. Its studios and transmitter are located at the 3rd floor, Doña Milagros Building, Pinili cor. Perdices St., Dumaguete, Negros Oriental.

References

Radio stations in Dumaguete
Radio stations established in 2015